Anglo-French (or sometimes Franco-British) may refer to:

France–United Kingdom relations
Anglo-Norman language or its descendants, varieties of French used in medieval England
Anglo-Français and Français (hound), an ancient type of hunting dog
Anglo-French (automobile), made in Birmingham, England 1896–7
Franglais, a Macaronic mixture of French and English languages
 A person or family of English and French ancestry